George Warburton may refer to:

George Warburton (footballer, born 1915) (1915–1996), English professional footballer
George Warburton (footballer, born 1934), Welsh professional footballer
 George Warburton (priest) (fl. 1631–1641), British Dean of Wells
George Drought Warburton, Member of the UK Parliament for Harwich
Sir George Warburton, 3rd Baronet (1675–1743), British Member of Parliament for Cheshire
George Warburton (died 1709), Member of the Parliament of Ireland for Gowran and Portarlington
George Warburton (1713–1753), Member of the Parliament of Ireland for Galway County
Sir George Warburton, 1st Baronet (1622–1676) of the Warburton baronets

See also
Warburton (disambiguation)